Ryan Hardie (born 17 March 1997) is a Scottish professional footballer who plays as a forward for  Plymouth Argyle. Hardie started his career with Rangers, and was loaned by them to Raith Rovers, St Mirren and Livingston. In July 2019 he moved to English club Blackpool, with whom he remained for 18 months, before signing for Plymouth Argyle in January 2021.

Hardie has represented Scotland at youth internationals up to and including the Under-21 level.

Club career

Rangers
Hardie, from Stranraer, is a boyhood Rangers fan. He made his professional debut for the team in a League Cup match against Falkirk on 23 September 2014, replacing Dean Shiels for the last four minutes of a 3–1 win at the Falkirk Stadium. He was first called up for a league game on 15 November, remaining an unused substitute in a 1–1 draw with Alloa Athletic at Ibrox. On 28 March 2015, he made his Scottish Championship debut, replacing Nicky Clark for the final 16 minutes of a 4–1 home win over Cowdenbeath. Hardie's first start was on 18 April away to Dumbarton and he scored his first two professional goals as they came from behind to win 3–1, the second being an overhead kick from Lee Wallace's cross.

On 17 February 2016, Hardie was loaned out to Raith Rovers on an initial month-long loan; however, this was extended to the end of the season a month later. On 25 July 2016, Hardie joined Scottish Championship club St Mirren on loan until January 2017. He made his debut in the League Cup against Edinburgh City on 30 July 2016. Hardie moved on loan again to Raith Rovers in January 2017, on a deal until May 2017. In January 2018, he returned to the second tier of Scottish football, this time signing a six-month loan deal with Livingston. Upon his return to Rangers, Hardie signed a one-year contract extension to tie him to the club until 2019.

Hardie again signed on loan for Livingston for the first part of the 2018–19 season. In January 2019 he signed another one-year contract with Rangers, and returned on loan to Livingston.

Blackpool
Hardie moved to EFL League One club Blackpool for an undisclosed fee in July 2019. He scored his first goal for Blackpool when he scored in an EFL Trophy tie against Morecambe on 3 September 2019.

He signed on loan for Plymouth Argyle for the rest of the 2019–20 season on 9 January 2020. On 29 July, he returned to Plymouth on loan until the end of the 2020–21 season.

Plymouth Argyle
Halfway through his second loan spell at the club, Hardie completed a permanent move on 29 January 2021.

International career
Hardie has represented Scotland at various age levels.

Hardie was selected for the Scotland U17 team in the UEFA under-17 Championship in 2014, where the Netherlands beat them in the semi finals.

He was selected for the under-20 squad in the 2017 Toulon Tournament.  After a historic first ever win against Brazil, the first at any level, Scotland later won the bronze medal. It was the nations first ever medal at the competition.

Career statistics

References

External links

1997 births
Living people
People from Stranraer
Scottish footballers
Association football forwards
Scotland youth international footballers
Scotland under-21 international footballers
Scottish Professional Football League players
English Football League players
Rangers F.C. players
St Mirren F.C. players
Raith Rovers F.C. players
Livingston F.C. players
Blackpool F.C. players
Plymouth Argyle F.C. players